Sofia Voultepsi is a Greek journalist, politician and a member of the Hellenic Parliament for New Democracy. She has been the Deputy Minister to the Prime Minister and the government spokesperson of Greece.

She was born in Piraeus and studied law at the National and Kapodistrian University of Athens.

External links
 

1949 births
Greek MPs 2004–2007
Greek MPs 2012 (May)
Greek MPs 2012–2014
Greek MPs 2015 (February–August)
Greek MPs 2015–2019
Greek women journalists
Living people
National and Kapodistrian University of Athens alumni
New Democracy (Greece) politicians
Writers from Piraeus
21st-century Greek politicians
21st-century Greek women politicians
Politicians from Piraeus
Greek MPs 2019–2023